Guioa semiglauca, known as the guioa or wild quince, is a rainforest tree of eastern Australia. It grows from Kioloa (35° S) near Batemans Bay in southern New South Wales to Eungella National Park (20° S) in tropical Queensland. It grows in many different types of rainforest, particularly common in regenerating areas and on sand in littoral rainforest.

Description 

Growing to around 20 metres tall, and 43 cm in diameter, though often seen much smaller than this. The outer bark is smooth, often coloured and patterned by various lichens. The outer bark is similar to coachwood, however it is more fluted and irregular.

The veiny leaflets are pinnate 5 to 10 cm long. The midrib extends beyond the leaf to form a tiny tip. Green above, whitish glaucous below. The yellow/green flowers form around September to November. The fruiting capsule matures from January to May. The seeds are oval covered by a thin layer of fleshy aril. Fruit eaten by a large variety of birds, including the Australian king parrot.

Uses 
Indigenous Australians used the saponin in the bark as a fish poison.

Gallery

References

External links

semiglauca
Sapindales of Australia
Trees of Australia
Flora of Queensland
Flora of New South Wales